Songs from Self Saucing is the seventh album from Australian comedy trio, 
Tripod, and their third live album. It was recorded in April 2006, during 
the last "Tripod Are: Self Saucing" show at the Melbourne International Comedy Festival, in 
front of a sell out crowd at the Hi-Fi Bar and Ballroom.

Owen Richardson from The Age caught their gig on 24 April 2006, he found, "[it] is just songs and jokes and hasn't the sublime, daggy silliness of their sci-fi musical Lady Robots, but it's all good stuff... [they] want us to know they care and are aware, but don't want to be seen to take themselves too seriously."

Most songs from the final performance in the "Tripod Are: Self Saucing" series are included on the album. It was nominated for Best Comedy Release at the ARIA Music Awards of 2007 but lost to Dave Hughes' DVD 'Live'.

Track listing

"Autistic" – 4:33
"King Kong" – 5:02
"Tall Man" – 3:36
"Too Many Remotes" – 4:24
"Lingering Dad" – 2:20
"Theme from MASH Guy" – 3:45
"No Daughter of Mine" – 1:39
"Forgive me Father" – 3:08
"Suicide Bomber" – 3:06
"Gonna Make You Happy Tonight" – 5:01

"Gonna Make You Happy Tonight" appeared on Middleborough Rd (October 2004) and Pod August Night (March 2006), and "Lingering Dad" is also on Pod August Night.

References 

Tripod (band) albums
2006 live albums